La Gallinola is among the highest peaks of the Matese, the highest mountain in Campania.

The environment is karst, with persistent grass and without large trees, as expected on the summit of a carbonate massif.

Located on the Apennines ridge between Campania and Molise, from the top it can be enjoyed at a wide panorama that, on clear days, sweeps between the Tyrrhenian and Adriatic Seas.

Sources

Mountains of Campania
Mountains of Molise
Highest points of Italian regions